HFS may refer to:

Computing
 Hierarchical file system, a system for organizing directories and files
 Hierarchical File System (Apple), a file system introduced in 1985 for the classic Mac OS
 Hierarchical File System (IBM MVS), a file system introduced in 1993 for MVS/ESA and subsequent operating systems
 Hi Performance FileSystem, a file system used by the HP-UX operating system
 HTTP File Server, a web server
 Hardware functionality scan, a security mechanism used in Microsoft Windows operating systems

Education 
 Haddonfield Friends School, in New Jersey, United States
 Harford Friends School, in Maryland, United States
 Hiranandani Foundation Schools, in India

Science and mathematics 
 Hereditarily finite set
 Hexafluorosilicic acid
 Hydrogen forward scattering
 Hyperfine structure

Transportation 
 French Frigate Shoals Airport, in Hawaii, United States
 Hagfors Airport, in Sweden
 Hatfield and Stainforth railway station, in England

Other uses 
 Croatian Film Association
 Hellenic Fire Service, in Greece
 Hemifacial spasm, a neurologic disorder
 High fructose syrup
 Hospitality Franchise Systems, later Cendant
 HFS Morgan, founder of Morgan Motor Company
 WHFS (historic), a former radio station in the Washington, D.C./Baltimore, Maryland

See also 
 High Performance File System, a file system for the OS/2 operating system